Protomicroplitis is a genus of braconid wasps in the family Braconidae. There are at least three described species in Protomicroplitis, found in the New World.

Species
These three species belong to the genus Protomicroplitis:
 Protomicroplitis calliptera (Say, 1836)
 Protomicroplitis centroamericanus Fernandez-Triana 2015
 Protomicroplitis mediatus (Cresson, 1865)

References

Further reading

 
 
 

Microgastrinae